State Route 75 (SR 75) is a  state highway that travels south-to-north through portions of White and Towns counties in the northern part of the U.S. state of Georgia. It connects Cleveland and the North Carolina state line, via Helen, Macedonia, and Hiawassee.

Route description

SR 75 begins at an intersection with US 129/SR 11 (North Main Street) in Cleveland in White County. This intersection also marks the southern terminus of SR 75 Alternate, which runs concurrent with US 129/SR 11 to the northwest. SR 75 heads north-northeast, past White County Park, to an intersection with the northern terminus of SR 384. About  later, the road crosses over the Chattahoochee River. Then, SR 17 (Unicoi Turnpike) begins a concurrency with it to the northwest. Immediately after is another crossing of the Chattahoochee River. In Helen, a Germany-themed town, they cross over the river again. They begin to parallel the river to the northwest. Just outside town, they meet the northern terminus of SR 75 Alternate and enter the Chattahoochee-Oconee National Forest. They head north and north-northeast on a curving fashion through the North Georgia mountains and cross into Towns County. They meet the eastern terminus of SR 180 and parallel the Hiawassee River for a while, before crossing over the river and heading to the north-northwest. They begin a concurrency with US 76/SR 2, just to the west of Macedonia. The four highways meet the eastern terminus of SR 288 and cross over a portion of Chatuge Lake. Then, they head northwest to the town of Hiawassee. In the northern part of town, SR 75 splits off to the northeast. It curves to the northwest, and circles back to the northwest, before leaving the Chattahoochee-Oconee National Forest, heads west, and curves to the north. It heads due north before a gradual curve to the north-northeast, just before meeting its northern terminus, the North Carolina state line. Here, the roadway continues as North Carolina Highway 175.

The only portion of SR 75 that is part of the National Highway System, a system of routes determined to be the most important for the nation's economy, mobility, and defense, is the entire length of the US 76/SR 2 concurrency.

History

The original southern terminus was at Georgia State Route 254 near the Mossy Creek and Skitt Mountain Golf Courses. This segment ran northwest into US 129/SR 11 and multiplexed with those routes until it reached Helen Way. Today, the segment between SR 254 and US 129 is named "Old Highway 75 South."

Major intersections

Special routes

Cleveland spur

State Route 75 Spur (SR 75 Spur) was a spur route of SR 75 that was unsigned on Nacoochee Road and Old Nacoochee Road just south-southeast of SR 75's intersection with US 129/SR 11/SR 75 Alt.

It began at an intersection with US 129/SR 11 (North Main Street) in the north-central part of the city of Cleveland. It traveled to the northeast. Just before an intersection with the southern terminus of Ash Street, it curved to the east-northeast. Just after an intersection with the northern terminus of Faulkner Street, it curved to the north-northeast. At an intersection with Woodman Hall Road, the name changed from Nacoochee Road to Old Nacoochee Road. It curved to the northwest and met its northern terminus, an intersection with SR 75 (Helen Highway).

Between 1951 and 1960, SR 75 Spur was established. It was decommissioned between 1983 and 1992.

Cleveland alternate

State Route 75 Alternate (SR 75 Alt.) is an  alternate route that exists entirely within the central part of White County. The southern part is within the city limits of Cleveland.

It begins at an intersection with US 129/SR 11 (North Main Street), where they meet the southern terminus of the SR 75 mainline (Helen Highway) and the northern terminus of Wilford Ash Sr. Parkway in the north-central part of Cleveland. US 129/SR 11/SR 75 Alt. head northwest and leave the city. Just outside the city limits, they meet the northern terminus of US 129 Byp./SR 11 Byp. (Appalachian Parkway) and the southern terminus of SR 75 Conn. (Hulsey Road). A short distance to the northwest, SR 75 Alt. splits off to the north-northeast. Little over  later, the road enters the Chattahoochee-Oconee National Forest. It intersects the eastern terminus of SR 348 (Richard B. Russell Scenic Highway). The road continues to the north-northeast and meets its northern terminus, an intersection with SR 17/SR 75, just northwest of Helen.

White County connector route

State Route 75 Connector (SR 75 Conn.) is a  connector for SR 75 that connects US 129/SR 11 and US 129 Byp./SR 11 Byp. with the SR 75 mainline. Its entire length is just north of the city. It is named Hulsey Road for its entire path.

It begins at an intersection with US 129/SR 11 north-northwest of the city of Cleveland. Here, the roadway continues as US 129 Byp./SR 11 Byp. (Appalachian Parkway). It travels to the east-northeast. It curves to a more easterly direction and meets its northern terminus, an intersection with SR 75 (Helen Highway).

Between the beginning of 2017 and the beginning of 2019, SR 75 Conn. was established.

See also

References

External links
 

 Georgia Roads (Routes 61 - 80)
 Georgia State Route 75 on State-Ends.com

075
Transportation in White County, Georgia
Transportation in Towns County, Georgia